Dixon Peak is a steep-sided peak rising to  at the southern end of Paryadin Ridge,  north of Cape Paryadin, South Georgia. It was roughly charted by Discovery Investigations personnel on the Discovery in the period 1926–30, and was named by the UK Antarctic Place-Names Committee in 1963 for Lieutenant John B. Dixon, Royal Navy, surveying officer on HMS Owen, which surveyed the area in 1960–61.

References 

Mountains and hills of South Georgia